Ken Riley is a physicist.

Career
Ken Riley read mathematics at the University of Cambridge and proceeded to a Ph.D. there in theoretical and experimental nuclear physics.

He became a research associate in elementary particle physics in Brookhaven, and then, having taken up lectureship at the Cavendish Laboratory, Cambridge, continued this research at the Rutherford Laboratory and Stanford; in particular he was involved in the experimental discovery of a number of the early baryonic resonances.

As well as having been Senior Tutor at Clare College, where he has taught physics and mathematics for over 40 years, he has served on many committees concerned with the teaching and examining of these subjects at all levels of tertiary and undergraduate education.

He is also one of the authors of 200 Puzzling Physics Problems and Mathematical Methods for Physics and Engineering.

References

British physicists
Living people
Year of birth missing (living people)